Hi-Fi Centar was a record label based in Belgrade, Serbia.

The company was originally formed in 1987 as a music store and was originally named Audio Klub Centar. In 1993 it changed the name to Hi-Fi Centar and moved to record publishing. During the 1990s it reissued albums by Atheist Rap, Bijelo Dugme, Parni Valjak, Prljavo Kazalište, YU Grupa, and others, and during the late 1990s and early 2000s it released albums by the top acts of the Serbian rock scene, such as Đorđe Balašević, Neverne Bebe, Partibrejkers, Riblja Čorba, Van Gogh, and others.

Artists 
Some of the artist that have been signed to Hi-Fi Centar include:

Atheist Rap
Bajaga i Instruktori
Bijelo Dugme
Đorđe Balašević
Hari Mata Hari
Bilja Krstić & Bistrik Orchestra
Madame Piano
Neverne Bebe
Partibrejkers
Riblja Čorba
Van Gogh

References
Hi-Fi Centar at Discogs

See also
 List of record labels

Serbian record labels
Record labels established in 1993
Rock record labels
Pop record labels
Serbian rock music